Theódór Júlíusson (born 21 August 1949) is an Icelandic actor. He has appeared in more than twenty films since 1994. Theódór won the 2012 Edda Award for Best Leading Actor for his performance as Hannes in Volcano.

Selected filmography

References

External links 

1949 births
Living people
Icelandic male film actors